Preparation day may refer to:
a day of rest in the life of a missionary of the Church of Jesus Christ of Latter-day Saints
the day before the Jewish Sabbath (see )
the day on which Jesus was buried after his crucifixion (see )